The Ducati Panigale is a family of sport motorcycles manufactured by Ducati since 2011. The Panigale is named after the small manufacturing town of Borgo Panigale. All motorcycles of this series use monocoque frame (the engine is a stressed member, replacing Ducati's conventional trellis frame).

899 Panigale, 2013–2015
959 Panigale, 2016–2020
1199 Panigale, 2012–2014
1299 Panigale, 2015–present
Panigale V4, 2018–present
Panigale V2, 2020–present

References

Panigale
Sport bikes